Mézériat is a commune in the Ain department in eastern France.

Geography
The Veyle flows west through the southern part of the commune, crosses the village, then flows southwest and forms part of the commune's southwestern border. Mézériat station has rail connections to Bourg-en-Bresse, Ambérieu-en-Bugey and Mâcon.

Population

See also
Communes of the Ain department

References

External links

Mézériat website

Communes of Ain
Ain communes articles needing translation from French Wikipedia
Bresse